The British Columbia Electric Railway (BCER) was an historic railway which operated in southwestern British Columbia, Canada. Originally the parent company for, and later a division of, BC Electric Company (now BC Hydro), the BCER assumed control of existing streetcar and interurban lines in southwestern British Columbia in 1897, and operated the electric railway systems in the region until the last interurban service was discontinued in 1958. During and after the streetcar era, BC Electric also ran bus and trolleybus systems in Greater Vancouver and bus service in Greater Victoria; these systems subsequently became part of BC Transit, and the routes in Greater Vancouver eventually came under the control of TransLink. Trolley buses still run in the City of Vancouver with one line extending into Burnaby.

History

Streetcar and interurban services were inaugurated in southwestern British Columbia between 1890 and 1891, operated by the following companies:
 National Electric Tramway and Lighting Company Limited, which launched the streetcar service in Victoria on February 22, 1890;
 Vancouver Electric Railway and Light Company Limited, which launched Vancouver's streetcar system on June 27, 1890; and
 Vancouver & Westminster Tramway Company, which launched New Westminster's streetcar system on October 8, 1891, as well as the Vancouver-New Westminster interurban line (via Central Park in Burnaby) in the same year.

With the global depression in the 1890s, all three companies went into receivership, and were amalgamated in 1895 into the Consolidated Railway and Light Company. The newly founded company was forced into receivership again after a streetcar accident in Victoria (the Point Ellice Bridge Disaster) resulted in 55 deaths, and was reorganized as the British Columbia Electric Railway Company Limited in April 1897.

Power supply
Power was supplied by then-innovative diversion projects at Buntzen Lake and on the Stave River system farther east, all of which were built primarily to supply power for the interurbans and street railway.

Interurban Rail Lines

Vancouver-Marpole

BCER began the Vancouver-Steveston interurban and freight service in 1905 after leasing the line from Canadian Pacific Railway (CPR) and electrifying it. The Vancouver-Marpole line's right-of-way (whose northern section runs beside Arbutus Street) remained under the ownership of the CPR, which continued running freight trains on the corridor until June 2001. With the end of freight operations on the line in sight, Vancouver City Council adopted the Arbutus Corridor Official Development Plan in 2000, designating the corridor as a transportation/greenway public thoroughfare to prevent other types of development from taking place along the right-of-way.

Marpole-Steveston (Lulu Island Branch)

The Steveston line's alignment on Lulu Island can be traced by Railway Avenue, Granville Avenue, Garden City Road, and Great Canadian Way. After the end of passenger service in 1958 the Granville and Garden City section of the line was relocated largely parallel to River Road north of Westminster Highway.

Marpole-New Westminster

Interurban service between Marpole and New Westminster along the North Arm of the Fraser River was started in 1909. Still in operation today, as part of the Southern Railway of British Columbia.

New Westminster to Chilliwack (Fraser Valley Branch)

Opened October 4, 1910 (also used by freight) and still in operation today, as part of the Southern Railway of British Columbia. This line made use of the New Westminster Bridge, opened in 1904.

 Burnaby Lake Line

The Burnaby Lake line's right-of-way is largely taken up by the Trans-Canada Highway, but sections of it survive as walking and biking trails.

Central Park Line

Following the cessation of interurban services on the Central Park Line, the right-of-way remained under the control of BC Hydro. By 1975, the Greater Vancouver Regional District proposed incorporating the right-of-way into a light rail line linking Vancouver and New Westminster, thereby reinstating passenger rail service on the corridor. The provincial government eventually took over the project, which evolved into the Vancouver SkyTrain's Expo Line.

New Westminster to Queensborough

The tracks from New Westminster to Queensborough and the 'Railway Bridge' across the north arm of the Fraser River are still in operation today, as part of the Southern Railway of British Columbia.

New Westminster to Fraser Mills

Opened in 1912, construction of ramps leading to and from the new Pattullo Bridge resulted in the closure of the Queensborough and Fraser Mills lines in 1937, as well as the truncation of the Burnaby Lake line to Sapperton.

Victoria to Deep Bay

Now called Deep Cove, the Victoria to Deep Cove line (1913), was one of three passenger railways to serve the Saanich Peninsula, and was closed on November 1, 1924 due to low ridership. The Victoria-Deep Cove interurban's alignment can be traced by Burnside Road, Interurban Road and the Interurban Rail Trail, West Saanich Road, Wallace Drive, Aldous Terrace, Mainwaring Road, one of Victoria International Airport's runways, and Tatlow Road to Deep Cove. Besides the stretch through the airport, the stretch at the Experimental Farm (now called the Sidney/Centre for Plant Health) has also been blocked.

Stave Lake

A  steam train branch line, the Stave Falls Branch, (constructed during the building of the original Stave Falls hydroelectric plant) was isolated from the main interurban network, and linked the power plant and community at Stave Falls to the Canadian Pacific Railway station at Ruskin. The route of the Stave Falls Branch along Hayward Lake is also now a walking trail managed by BC Hydro and the District of Mission, with sections of it south of Ruskin Dam used as local powerline and neighbourhood walking trails.

Port Moody-Coquitlam

The Port Moody-Coquitlam Railway connected the Port Moody-Ioco spur of the Canadian Pacific Railway to the Coquitlam Dam in order to haul supplies and materials to the dam.

Alouette Lake

Similar to the Stave Lake and Port Moody-Coquitlam lines, the Alouette Lake dam tracks connected power facilities to the CPR that ran on the north side of the Fraser River at Kanaka Creek in Haney.

Jordan River

This 5.3-mile railway connected the powerhouse and harbour at the mouth of the Jordan River to the Jordan River Dam.

"Rails-to-Rubber" Transition

BCER ended streetcar service in New Westminster on December 5, 1938. The company then announced its "Rails-to-Rubber" conversion programme on September 30, 1944, with North Vancouver's last streetcar service and two of Vancouver's streetcar lines ending in April 1947, and Victoria's streetcar service ending on July 4, 1948. The Chilliwack line ceased service in 1950, followed by the Vancouver-Marpole line in 1952 and the Burnaby Lake line in 1953. The stretch of the Central Park line in Burnaby and New Westminster was closed on October 23, 1953, followed by the rest of the line through Vancouver on July 16, 1954. The last streetcar line in Vancouver, the 14 Hastings East, ran on April 22, 1955. The Marpole-New Westminster interurban line was closed in 1956, followed by the Marpole-Steveston line on February 28, 1958, marking the complete closure of the interurban system.

In 1961, the provincial government took over BC Electric, with the railway becoming a division of Crown corporation BC Hydro.  In August 1988, BC Hydro sold their freight division which included rolling stock and rails and the rights to run freight trains through Fraser Valley Subdivision, not the corridor, to a company known as Itel of Chicago who resold it to a new shortline operator and the railway is now known as the Southern Railway of British Columbia and is exclusively a freight railway.

At the time, BC Hydro did not specifically reserve rights to operate passenger rail service using Southern Railway of British Columbia's facilities, but did retain the ability to grant operating rights to others, including to providers of passenger rail service, that do not materially interfere with Southern Railway of British Columbia's operations.

In addition, BC Hydro in 1988 also sold the track assets of a section between Cloverdale from Pratt Junction through Langley City and beyond to CP Rail, but retained ownership of the right-of-way. At the time, BC Hydro also granted CPR a statutory right-of-way to use this section of the corridor in perpetuity, but put agreements in place to retain partial running rights for passenger service, which were renewed in 2009.

While there has been a number proposals regarding the restart of a commuter passenger rail service along the line, a review was conducted by the British Columbia Ministry of Transportation and Infrastructure in 2010. The review noted issues around high cost per ride and low projected ridership relative to bus alternatives.

Subsequently, Translink conducted a study as part of the 2010-2012 Surrey Rapid Transit Study to explore merits of utilizing the Interurban corridor for fast, frequent, and reliable rapid transit service. The interurban corridor was not selected, nor recommended for further consideration because the corridor does not directly connect relevant regional destinations of Surrey Central and Langley City, resulted in less attractive travel times between key destinations, and would require significant capital investments to meet safety requirements and reliability objectives compared to alternatives.

In particular, Translink noted that the routing of the interurban line does not directly connect to the largest regional centre in the South of Fraser – Surrey Metro Centre – which is expected to be the focus of future population and employment growth, and the current alignment is indirect and through lower density and diverse areas, with a low ridership catchment near potential stations. Also, Translink estimated that the interurban estimated travel times are not competitive with rapid transit along Fraser Highway or King George Boulevard, with transit times estimated to be around 63 minutes to travel between Langley and Surrey Central, which is double that of a possible bus rapid transit line or a Skytrain route along the Fraser Highway. Finally, Translink has indicated that freight traffic along the line is expected to increase along the corridor, due to increased traffic at the Port of Metro Vancouver, in particular the Roberts Bank Superport.

Remaining BCER Cars
After the decommission of the BCER streetcar and interurban system, most of the cars were either scrapped or burned underneath the Burrard Bridge, but some cars were sold for various other uses such as becoming bunkhouses, storage sheds and in some cases decor. A handful of cars were also donated to various museums mostly in the U.S. Since then however, many preservation societies have bought back the cars and begun restoring them. The following is a list of the known BCER cars in existence and their current locations (as of January 2016).

Streetcars
 #53   Built in 1904, operated in Vancouver, on permanent static display inside The Old Spaghetti Factory in Gastown, Vancouver, BC.
 #153 Built in 1908, operated in North Vancouver, currently on display at the Museum of North Vancouver (MoNoVa), North Vancouver, BC.
 #400 Built in 1922, operated in Victoria, now located at the Nelson Electric Tramway Society in Nelson, BC.

Interurban Cars
 #1207 Built in 1905, operated on the Marpole-Steveston Line, was located at the Downtown Historic Railway in Vancouver, BC. As of January 2016, it has been relocated to the Fraser Valley Historical Railway Society, Cloverdale, BC.
 #1220 Built in 1913, operated on the Marpole-Steveston Line, currently being restored at the Steveston Tram Museum, Richmond, BC.
 #1223 Built in 1913, operated on the Burnaby Lake Line, on static display at the Burnaby Village Museum, Burnaby, BC.
 #1225 Built in 1913, operated on the Marpole-Steveston and Burnaby Lake Lines, currently in operation at the Fraser Valley Historical Railway Society, Cloverdale, BC.
 #1231 Built in 1913, operated on the Marpole-Steveston and Burnaby Lake Lines, now located at the Fraser Valley Historical Railway Society, Cloverdale, BC.
 #1235 Built in 1913, operated on the Marpole-Steveston Line, located at the Canada Science and Technology Museum, Ottawa, ON
 #1304 Built in 1911, operated on the Fraser Valley-Chilliwack Line, currently under restoration at the Fraser Valley Historical Railway Society, Cloverdale, BC.

See also
 Nelson Electric Tramway (restoration/operation of a former BCER tram)
 Trolleybuses in Vancouver

Footnotes

References
   (Also includes pictures of BCER railcars on this run from the Royal BC Museum collection)

External links
 History of the BC Electric Railway
 Preserving BC Hydro's History (defunct link now visible on the Wayback Machine)
 

Defunct British Columbia railways
British Columbia Electric Railway
Defunct intermodal transport authorities
Interurban railways in British Columbia
Economy of Vancouver
History of British Columbia
Street railways in British Columbia
Railway companies established in 1897
Railway companies disestablished in 1989
Standard gauge railways in Canada
Electric railways in Canada